Aloe argenticauda is a species of plant in the genus Aloe. It is endemic to Namibia.  Its natural habitats are subtropical or tropical dry shrubland and rocky areas.

References 

argenticauda
Endemic flora of Namibia
Least concern plants
Least concern biota of Africa
Taxonomy articles created by Polbot
Plants described in 1974